The 2016 FIBA U18 Women's European Championship Division C was the 11th edition of the Division C of the FIBA U18 Women's European Championship, the third tier of the European women's under-18 basketball championship. It was played in Tbilisi, Georgia, from 8 to 13 July 2016. Armenia women's national under-18 basketball team won the tournament.

Participating teams

First round

Group A

Group B

5th–7th place classification

Group C

Championship playoffs

Final standings

References

External links
FIBA official website

2016
2016–17 in European women's basketball
FIBA U18
International basketball competitions hosted by Georgia (country)
Sports competitions in Tbilisi
FIBA